Arne Anka is a Swedish comic strip drawn by Charlie Christensen under the pseudonym Alexander Barks from 1983 to 1995 and 2006 and forward. The title character closely resembles Donald Duck (who is called Kalle Anka in Swedish). The likeness with Donald Duck is only feather deep, however; the comics often take place at a bar, Zeke's, where Arne gets drunk while he cynically thinks about and discusses life. This usually happens in the company of his friend, Krille Krokodil ("Krille Crocodile"). In other situations, Arne is found walking, with friends or alone, and occasionally he is found in a completely different setting (albeit with the same group of friends), like ancient Rome or 18th century Paris. Always, however, he comments on life and (especially Swedish) society with sharp wit.

Some distinct features about Arne Anka is deep love for Swedish poetry and literature, his miserable financial situation, his excessive consumption of alcohol, and his enthusiasm towards women - even though he has very little luck with any such connections.

Charlie Christensen uses his friends as inspiration for the characters and stories in Arne Anka. One of his friends has said that you sometimes notice that Charlie Christensen gets a particular look and then a few weeks later you read what you just said in an Arne Anka strip.

In 1997, a few pages were translated to English in connection with an exhibition of Nordic comics in France, and the publication of an English-language anthology. In this translation, the character was given the name "Arnie the Duck".

The Disney threat 
In the beginning of the 1990s, The Walt Disney Company threatened to sue the author, Charlie Christensen, due to Arne Anka's similarity with Donald Duck. As a response, Charlie Christensen drew a comic strip about Arne faking his own death, so that he could have plastic surgery done to his beak in secrecy. Arne then returned with a new, pointed beak, and the pseudonym Alexander Barks was changed to Alexander X.
After a while though, Arne went to a novelty store to buy a fake beak, which looked exactly like his old one. This new beak was drawn showing a small rubber band holding it in place until the threat of being sued was withdrawn. In the meanwhile, however, Disney's threat of a lawsuit, which received very extensive publicity in Sweden, had turned Arne Anka into a Swedish independence hero and increased his popularity manyfold.

Theater play 
In 1995, Arne Anka was produced as a play at Stockholm City Theatre (Stockholms Stadsteater). The play was written by Christensen himself, and it was called "Arne Anka - en afton på Zekes" ("Arne Anka - an evening at Zeke's"), starring Robert Gustafsson as Arne.

Comeback 
In December 2006, after more than ten years of absence, Arne made his comeback in Christensen's Arne Anka, Part V: Återuppståndelsen (The resurrection).
When we meet him now, he is divorced with two kids, pays child support and, if possible, has even worse finances than in the past.

Albums 

 Arne Anka, Tago 1989
 
 Arne Anka, Del II, Tago 1991
 
 Arne Anka, Del III, Tago 1993
 
 Arne Anka, Bombad och sänkt" (Bombed and Sunk), Autobiography, Tago 1993
 
 Arne Anka, Del IV, Tago 1995
 
 Jag, Arne (Me, Arne) (collected comics 1983-1995), (hardcover), Tago, 1997
 
 Jag, Arne (Me, Arne) (collected comics 1983-1995), (softcover), Kartago, 2001
 
 Arne Anka, Del V: Återuppståndelsen (The resurrection), Kartago 2006
 
 Arne Anka, Del VI: Manöver i mörkret (Maneuver in the dark), Kartago 2007
 
 Arne Anka, Del VII: Ner med monarkin (Down with the Monarchy), Kartago 2008
 
 Arne Anka: Rapport från kriget (Report from the war), Kartago 2010
 
 Arne Anka IX - Voodoo vid vatten (Voodoo by the water), Kartago 2011
 
 Arne Anka X - Utsikt från en svamp (View from a mushroom), Kartago 2013
 
 Arne Anka XI - Dagbok från Svitjod (Diary from Svitjod), Kartago 2014
 
 Arne Anka XII - Mentala selfies (Mental selfies), Kartago 2016

Trivia
For Joachim Trier's 2021 Norwegian film The Worst Person in the World, Christensen was hired to do the comic "Gaupe" (roughly "Lynxie") in an Arne Anka-inspired style. Her er tegneserien Gaupe fra Verdens verste menneske, Walter Wehus, Empirix.no, Dec. 31, 2021. (Norwegian)

See also
 The Disneyland Memorial Orgy
 Air Pirates

References

Swedish comic strips
Anka, Arne
Anka, Arne
Satirical comics
Parody comics
Disney parodies
Underground comix
1983 comics debuts
1995 comics endings
Anka, Arne
Comics about animals
Comics adapted into plays
Anka, Arne
Comics about ducks